Super Griptape is an album by the band Further released in 1993; it is UK re-issue of the original US Griptape LP with 3 bonus tracks; this release omits the original opening track "Overrated".

Track listing 

 Totally Baked - 6.33
 Don't Need A Rope - 3.22
 Real Gone - 2.47
 Gimmie Indie Fox - 4.08
 Greasy - 1.28
 Angela Rites Th Rckrs - 5.19
 Bazooka - 1.31
 Still - 7.35
 Flounder (Ubel) - 0.33
 Fix It's Broken - 6.59
 Teenage Pants - 3.17
 The Death Of An A&R Man - 1.56
 Smudge - 2.19
 Fantastic Now - 6.12
 Filling Station - 4.49
 Under And In - 1.37
 Westward Ho (Wharton's Trip) - 8.52

References

1993 albums